Sára Tóth (born 18 November 1993 in Békéscsaba) is a Hungarian handballer who plays for Orosházi NKC in left back position.

Achievements
Magyar Kupa:
Silver Medalist: 2012

References

External links
 Sára Tóth career statistics at Worldhandball

1993 births
Living people
People from Békéscsaba
Hungarian female handball players
Békéscsabai Előre NKSE players
Sportspeople from Békés County
21st-century Hungarian women